Alan "Howling Laud" Hope (born 16 June 1942) is a British politician and the Leader of the Official Monster Raving Loony Party (OMRLP).  On the death of the party's founder Screaming Lord Sutch in 1999, Hope and his pet cat, Catmando, were jointly elected as leaders of the OMRLP. Since June 2002 Hope has been the party's sole leader following Catmando's death in a road accident.

Hope was the first-ever OMRLP candidate to be elected to public office, when he was elected unopposed to a seat on Ashburton Town Council in Devon in 1987. He subsequently became the Mayor of Ashburton in 1998.

In 2010 Hope was elected unopposed to Fleet Town Council in Hampshire.  Hope's longtime friendship with satirist Jacob M. Appel formed the basis for the latter's novel, The Biology of Luck, which is reportedly an allegory for modern British politics.

Biography
Hope was known as Kerry Rapid and The Soultones when he was a back-up singer for rock and roll performer Screaming Lord Sutch in the 1960s. As Leader of the Official Monster Raving Loony Party, Sutch made Hope the party's Deputy Chairman in 1982. Hope subsequently became the party's Chairman and Deputy Leader, before becoming Leader following Sutch's death in 1999.

As an OMRLP candidate, Hope was elected unopposed to Ashburton Town Council in Devon in 1987. This caused a dilemma in the party as it had previously been decided that any member who was elected to a public office should be expelled from the party. This rule was changed at the 1987 Party Conference to allow Hope to remain a member and official representative of the party. He later rose to become Deputy Mayor, before being made Mayor of Ashburton in 1998.

Hope is the only OMRLP candidate to have been elected to public office, although an ex-member, Stuart Hughes, won a seat on East Devon District Council for the Raving Loony Green Giant Party in 1991.

Hope's pub and guesthouse in Ashburton, The Golden Lion, was the OMRLP's Party Headquarters and conference centre from 1984 until 2000, after which he sold the property and moved to Hampshire. There he took over the Dog and Partridge public house at Yateley until 2011, which served as the new party headquarters.

Upon Sutch's death in 1999, Hope and his cat Catmando (more often spelt Cat Mandu) were elected as joint leaders of the OMRLP. Catmando served until his death as a result of a traffic accident in July 2002, whereupon Hope became the sole leader of the party.

In 2003, Hope appeared on Top Gear during the second episode of series 2. In its challenge searching for 'Britain's fastest Political Party', he came in last.

Elections contested

Teignbridge in the 1983, 1987 general election, and 1992 general elections.
1999 Kensington and Chelsea by-election, where he came 17th out of 18 candidates with 20 votes (0.1%).
Aldershot in the 2001 general election: he came last out of seven with 390 votes (0.9%), narrowly behind Arthur Uther Pendragon.
2003 Brent East by-election, where he came 13th of 16 candidates with 59 votes (0.28%) in a contest won by the Liberal Democrat candidate Sarah Teather.
2004 Hartlepool by-election polling 12th out of 14 candidates with 80 votes (0.3%).
Aldershot in the 2005 general election, where he took sixth, last place with 553 votes (1.1%).
2006 Blaenau Gwent by-election, where he took sixth, last place with 318 votes (1.2%).
2007 Sedgefield by-election where he came tenth of 11 candidates with 129 votes (0.5%). 
2009 Norwich North by-election: Hope came ninth of 12 candidates with 144 votes (0.4%).
2010 general election: Hope contested Witney in Oxfordshire against incumbent MP, Conservative Party leader, David Cameron, and came sixth of ten candidates with 234 votes (0.3%). Cameron held the seat with an increased majority of 22,740 and following coalition talks became Prime Minister.
Town council election in Fleet, Hampshire in May 2010, and was elected to one of its quota of parish seats unopposed.
In March 2011, he stood in the Barnsley Central by-election and won 198 votes (0.8%) – eighth out of the nine candidates.
In May 2011, he stood in the Leicester South by-election and won 553 votes – last out of five candidates with 1.6% of the vote.
In March 2012 he stood in the Bradford West by-election winning 111 votes (0.3%) – placed last of eight candidates.
In November 2012 Hope stood in the Manchester Central by-election and polled, on a very low turnout of 18.2%, tenth out of 12 candidates, with 78 votes (0.5%), achieving just over a quarter of the vote achieved by the Pirate Party and less than an eighth of the vote of any of the top five candidates, who were members of the largest parties in the UK.
In the 2013 South Shields by-election, Hope came eighth out of nine candidates with 197 votes (0.8%), which was notably only 155 votes behind the Liberal Democrats' candidate.
Hope stood as the OMRLP candidate at the Clacton by-election on 9 October 2014 coming seventh out of eight candidates with 127 votes (0.4%), beating "high class courtesan" Charlotte Rose, who campaigned "for sexual freedom" but received only 56 votes. Hope had put forward the Loony policy to turn the whole area into a theme park, in his BBC TV interview a week before the Election took place.
2015 general election: Hope contested the constituency of Uxbridge and South Ruislip against the incumbent Mayor of London, Boris Johnson. He came eighth of thirteen candidates with 72 votes (0.2%). Former OMRLP member (and former Screaming Lord Sutch band member) Lord Toby Jug stood in the same constituency for the Eccentric Party, gaining 50 votes (0.1%).
In June 2016, Hope was a candidate in the Tooting by-election, finishing seventh of 14 candidates with 54 votes (0.2%).
At the 2016 Richmond Park by-election in December 2016, Hope finished fourth of eight candidates with 184 votes (0.45%), his highest placed by-election result at the time.
2017 general election: Hope contested the constituency of Maidenhead against the incumbent UK Prime Minister Theresa May. He finished ninth of thirteen candidates with 119 votes equating to 0.2% of the vote.
At the 2018 Lewisham East by-election in June 2018, Hope finished ninth out of fourteen candidates with 93 votes (0.4%).
At the 2019 Peterborough by-election in June 2019, he received 112 votes (0.33%), finishing 10th in a field of 15 candidates.
At the 2019 general election, he stood in the North-East Hampshire constituency, where he lives. He received 576 votes, coming last out of six candidates with one percent of the vote.
At the 2021 Batley and Spen by-election held on 1 July he finished in eighth place in a field of sixteen candidates, with 107 votes (0.3%).
At the 2021 North Shropshire by-election held on 16 December he received 118 votes (0.3%), finishing eighth out of fourteen candidates.
At the 2022 City of Chester by-election held on 1 December 2022 he received 156 votes (0.6%), finishing eighth out of nine candidates.
At the 2023 West Lancashire by-election held on 9 February 2023 he received 210 votes (0.9%), finishing sixth out of six candidates.

References

Further reading
 Monster Raving Loony Party race heating up between chairman – and his cat Reuters. Retrieved 23 September 1999.
 Loony tradition continues at by-election BBC News Retrieved 1 July 1999.

External links
Howling Laud Hope biographical videos
Official Monster Raving Loony Party – Official website

1942 births
Councillors in Devon
Councillors in Hampshire
Leaders of political parties in the United Kingdom
Living people
Mayors of places in Devon
Official Monster Raving Loony Party politicians
People from Surrey Heath (district)
British political candidates